Pchelnik may refer to:
Darya Pchelnik (born 1981), Belarusian hammer thrower
Pchelnik, Dobrich Province, a village in Dobrichka Municipality of Dobrich Province, Bulgaria
Pchelnik, Varna Province, a village in Dolni Chiflik Municipality of Varna Province, Bulgaria
Pchelnik, Russia, several rural localities in Russia